Yellow Belt may refer to the following:
 A level in the Japanese system of classification known as Kyū.
 A road in the Allegheny County belt system.